The Stade de l'Ill is a multi-purpose stadium in Mulhouse, France. Home to FC Mulhouse, it has a capacity of 11,303.

External links
Stadium information

L'Ill
FC Mulhouse
Athletics (track and field) venues in France
Sports venues in Haut-Rhin
Sports venues completed in 1979